The IJsselderby is a football derby between Dutch clubs, Go Ahead Eagles from Deventer, and PEC Zwolle from Zwolle.

Often supporters call Go Ahead Eagles, ‘Kowet’ (Dialect for Go Ahead) and PEC Zwolle simply ‘PEC’.

The rivalry between the clubs started when they competed in the Eerste Divisie in the 1990s. Until the 1990s, Go Ahead Eagles played in the Eredivisie most of the time and is the more successful of both clubs winning the national championship in 1917, 1922, 1930 and 1933. The Deventer football club won the KNVB Cup in 1965.

Deventer and Zwolle are both situated along the river IJssel. The distance between cities is 21 miles. Go Ahead Eagles supporters call their rivals ‘Olle’, as Zwolle sounds to disgusting for them and Zwolle fans call their rivals ‘Egels’, which roughly translates to "hedgehogs". There have been several fights between the supporters of the two clubs. It is known as one of the fiercest of derbies in the Netherlands, along with Feyenoord – Ajax (De Klassieker), NEC – Vitesse (Gelderse Derby) and SC Heerenveen – SC Cambuur (Friesche Derby).

Results

Statistics

PEC Zwolle
Go Ahead Eagles
Football derbies in the Netherlands